Vitaly Citovsky is an American biochemist, currently a SUNY Distinguished Professor at Stony Brook University, State University of New York, and also a published author. He is a Fellow of the American Association for the Advancement of Science.

References

Year of birth missing (living people)
Living people
Stony Brook University faculty
American biochemists
Fellows of the American Academy of Microbiology